The 2020–21 snooker season was a professional snooker season with tournaments played from 13 September 2020 to 9 May 2021. As a result of the COVID-19 pandemic, the season was played almost entirely without a live audience with only the 2021 World Snooker Championship being played in front of a crowd. All snooker tournaments in the season were played in the United Kingdom, due to travel and quarantine restrictions preventing the tour and players from utilising usual venues.

Judd Trump won five ranking events during the season, whilst Mark Selby won the 2021 World Snooker Championship, to win his fourth world championship. Trump retained the world number one spot throughout the season, also reaching the final of the 2020 UK Championship, losing to Neil Robertson.  Teenager Yan Bingtao won the other Triple Crown event, the 2021 Masters. This was the first season in a decade that Ronnie O'Sullivan failed to win a triple crown event; O'Sullivan was defeated in all 5 ranking finals he reached this season, marking the first season since 2016–17 that he had not captured a ranking title.

Overview 
With the exception of two events played at the Celtic Manor Resort in Newport, Wales (the Welsh Open and the Tour Championship) and the World Championship at the Crucible Theatre in Sheffield; all snooker tournaments were played at the Marshall Arena in Milton Keynes. The venue was used to cooperate with restrictions caused by the COVID-19 lockdown in the United Kingdom.
 
Towards the end of October, World Snooker Tour had announced that the UK Championship would have the first round played at the same arena, but all televised stages would then be played at the York Barbican: on 4 November, days after the UK Government announced a lockdown for all of England, this was then revised to include the entire tournament.

Despite space being allocated for back-to-back events in China during March, WST later confirmed on 3 December 2020 that all China-based tournaments were cancelled, due to continuing travel restrictions, making it the first season in more than a decade where no tournaments would be staged in Asia. In its place, a new WST Pro Series was added, taking place between January and March 2021.

On 4 January 2021, the week prior to the event, WST announced that the Masters would be moved to the Marshall Arena, as a result of logistical challenges associated with Alexandra Palace having no on-site facilities and lengthy travel requirements from a hotel, preventing a secure 'bubble' from being formed to host the event.

On 26 January 2021, World Snooker Tour announced that the Welsh Open would become the first event that season to be played outside the Marshall Arena, at the Celtic Manor Resort in Newport. This was made possible due to a Covid-bubble being able to be created with similar on-site accommodation facilities, meaning players were able to stay within the bubble while playing in the event. Later in the season, World Snooker confirmed that the 2021 Tour Championship event would be played at Celtic Manor as the final event of the season prior to the World Championship at the Crucible Theatre.

On 13 March 2021, World Snooker announced that the World Snooker Championship would welcome a limited number of fans, as part of an Events Research Programme run by the government. The programme intends to test a variety of settings to generate evidence on how fans may be safely welcomed into sporting events in future, with the Crucible Theatre providing evidence of a "theatre setting".

On 20 April 2021, towards the start of the World Championship, it was announced that Barry Hearn would step down as Chairman of the World Snooker Tour and as President of Matchroom Sport. Steve Dawson will replace Hearn as the Chairman of the World Snooker Tour after the conclusion of the season, although Hearn will remain in an advisory position on tour.

Players 
The World Snooker Tour in the 2020–21 season consists of a field of 128 professional players. The top 64 players from the prize money rankings after the 2020 World Championship, and the 35 players earning a two-year card the previous year automatically qualify for the season. Next, four places are allocated to the top four on the One Year Ranking List who have not already qualified for the Main Tour. Another two players came from the Challenge Tour, two players came from the CBSA China Tour, and a further 12 places were available through the Q School (four Event 1 winners, four Event 2 winners and four Event 3 winners). Two-year tour cards were also awarded to any player outside the top 64, who qualified for the main stage of the 2020 World Snooker Championship at the Crucible. The rest of the places on to the tour came from amateur events.

New professional players 
All players listed below received a tour card for two seasons.

International champions
EBSA European Championship winner:  Andrew Pagett (deferred)
:  Aaron Hill
WSF Open winner:  Ashley Hugill
WSF Open runner-up:  Iulian Boiko
WSF Junior Open winner:  Gao Yang
WSF Junior Open runner-up:  Sean Maddocks

One Year Ranking List

CBSA China Tour

Challenge Tour

World Championship Wildcards

Q School
Event 1

Event 2

Event 3

Invitational Tour Card

Calendar 
The following tables outline the dates and results for all the events of the World Snooker Tour and the World Seniors Tour.

World Snooker Tour

World Seniors Tour

World ranking points

The 2020–21 snooker season featured the following points distribution for World Snooker Tour ranking events:

Notes

References

External links 
 Calendar 2020/2021 at World Snooker
  Calendar 2020/2021 at snooker.org
 WSS Tour news at seniorsnooker.com

2020
Season 2020
Season 2021